This is a list of all citron cultivars. Varieties are not included on this list. The formal cultivar name of citron cultivars will always be Citrus medica 'Cultivar Name' (for example: Citrus medica 'Corsican').

References 

 
Lists of cultivars